Thai Veedu is a 1983 Indian Tamil-language film directed by R. Thyagarajan, starring Rajinikanth and Anita Raj. The film, released on 14 April 1983, was simultaneously in Hindi as Jeet Hamaari with Rajinikanth returning.

Plot 

Rajasekaran (Major Sundarrajan) is a rich man who is in possession of an antique sword that holds the key to a treasure. Nagalingam (Thengai Srinivasan), a criminal, makes several unsuccessful attempts to steal the sword from Rajasekaran. On one such attempts Anand (Jaishankar) saves Rajasekaran and becomes his trusted guy to protect the sword. Raju (Rajnikanth), an orphan who is being raised by an alcoholic, ex-thief Rajasingam (M. N. Nambiar), is an expert in boosting cars and Anita (Anita Raj) is his love interest. Several years back, Rajasingam had stolen a car owned by Nagalingam with a child inside without knowing that the car and the child (Raju) actually belonged to Rajasekaran. One day Rajasingam spots Nagalingam in a shopping complex and believing that Raju is the son of Nagalingam, he hands Raju to him as his own son. Nagalingam deceitfully accepts Raju as his son and cleverly employs him to steal the sword from Rajasekaran, his real father. While Raju attempts to steal the sword, Anand keeps thwarting him. Despite Anand's efforts Raju manages to loot the sword, but then discovers that he's actually the son of Rajasekaran and he himself had been instrumental in stealing his own family treasure for the wrong men. With the help of Anand, Raju fights with Nagalingam's gang to successfully retrieve their family treasure and reunites with his family.

Cast 
Rajinikanth as Raju/Mohan
Anita Raj as Anitha
Jai Shankar as Anand
Vijayakumar as Vijay
M. N. Nambiar as Rajasingam
Thengai Srinivasan as Nagalingam
Major Sundarrajan as Rajasekaran
Suhasini Maniratnam as Geetha
Pandari Bai as Nirmala
Silk Smitha as Vijay's love interest
K. Natraj as Gowtham (Guest appearance)
Rajesh as Geetha's love interest (Guest appearance)
A. R. S as Police Commissioner
Idichapuli Selvaraj
Bayilvan Ranganathan

Soundtrack 
The music was composed by Shankar–Ganesh, with lyrics by Vaali. The highlight of the album was the disco song "Unnai Azhaithathu".

References

External links 
 

1980s masala films
1980s Tamil-language films
1983 films
Films directed by R. Thyagarajan (director)